This is a list of events that happened in 2012 in Mexico. The article also lists the most important political leaders during the year at both federal and state levels.

Incumbents

Federal government

President
 President
Felipe Calderon , until November 30 
Enrique Peña Nieto , starting December 1

Cabinet

 Interior Secretary (SEGOB)
Alejandro Poiré Romero, until November 30
Miguel Ángel Osorio Chong, starting December 1
 Secretary of Foreign Affairs (SRE)
Patricia Espinosa, until November 30
José Antonio Meade, starting December 1
Secretariat of Agriculture and Rural Development (SEGARPA)
Francisco Javier Mayorga Castañeda, until November 30
Enrique Martínez y Martínez, starting December 1 
Secretary of Agricultural, Territorial and Urban Development (SEDATU)
Jorge Carlos Ramírez Marín(starting December 1) 
 Communications Secretary (SCT)
Dionisio Pérez-Jácome Friscione, until November 30
Gerardo Ruiz Esparza, starting December 1 
 Education Secretary (SEP)
Alonso Lujambio, until March 16
José Ángel Córdova, March 16-November 30
Emilio Chuayffet Chemor, starting December 1
 Secretary of Defense (SEDENA)
Guillermo Galván Galván, until November 30
Salvador Cienfuegos Cepeda, starting December 1
 Secretary of Navy (SEMAR)
Mariano Francisco Saynez Mendoza, until November 30
Vidal Francisco Soberón Sanz, starting December 1
 Secretary of Labor and Social Welfare (STPS)
Rosalinda Vélez Juárez, until November 30
Alfonso Navarrete Prida (starting December 1)
 Secretary of Welfare (SEDESOL)
Heriberto Félix Guerra, until November 30
Rosario Robles, starting December 1
 Tourism Secretary (SECTUR)
Gloria Guevara, until November 30
 Claudia Ruiz Massieu, starting December 1
 Secretary of the Environment (SEMARNAT)
Juan Rafael Elvira Quesada, until November 30
Juan José Guerra Abud, starting December 1
 Secretary of Health (SALUD)
Salomón Chertorivski Woldenberg, November 30
Mercedes Juan López, starting December 1
Secretary of Finance and Public Credit (SHCP)
José Antonio Meade, until November 30
Luis Videgaray Caso, starting December 1
Secretary of Economy (SE)
Bruno Ferrari García de Alba, until November 30
Idelfonso Guajardo, starting December 1
Secretary of Energy (SENER)
Jordy Herrera Flores, until November 30
Pedro Joaquín Coldwell, starting December 1
Comisión Federal de Electricidad (CFE)
Francisco Rojas Gutiérrez, starting December 1
Pemex
Emilio Lozoya, starting December 1
Attorney General (PRG)
Marisela Morales, until December 4)
Jesús Murillo Karam, starting December 4
Chief of Staff: Aurelio Nuño Mayer, starting December 4
Coordinación de Comunicación Social de Presidencia (Coordination of Social Communication of the Presidency): David López Gutiérrez (starting December 1)
Estado Mayor Presidencial (Presidential Security Staff): Rodolfo Miranda Moreno, (starting December 1)

Governors

 Aguascalientes: Carlos Lozano de la Torre 
 Baja California: José Guadalupe Osuna Millán 
Baja California Sur: Marcos Covarrubias Villaseñor, 
 Campeche: Fernando Ortega Bernés 
 Chiapas
Juan Sabines Guerrero, Coalition for the Good of All, until December 7
Manuel Velasco Coello , starting December 8
 Chihuahua: César Duarte Jáquez 
 Coahuila: Rubén Moreira Valdez 
 Colima: Mario Anguiano Moreno 
 Durango: Jorge Herrera Caldera 
 Guanajuato: Miguel Márquez Márquez 
 Guerrero: Ángel Aguirre Rivero 
 Hidalgo: Francisco Olvera Ruiz 
 Jalisco: Emilio González Márquez 
 State of Mexico: Eruviel Ávila Villegas 
 Michoacán: Fausto Vallejo 
 Morelos
Marco Antonio Adame , until October 1.
Graco Ramírez , starting October 1.
 Nayarit: Roberto Sandoval Castañeda 
 Nuevo León: Rodrigo Medina de la Cruz 
 Oaxaca: Gabino Cué Monteagudo  
 Puebla: Rafael Moreno Valle Rosas 
 Querétaro: José Eduardo Calzada Rovirosa 
 Quintana Roo: Roberto Borge Angulo 
 San Luis Potosí: Fernando Toranzo Fernández 
 Sinaloa: Mario López Valdez 
 Sonora: Guillermo Padrés Elías 
 Tabasco: Andrés Granier Melo , until December 31, 2012
 Tamaulipas: Egidio Torre Cantú 	
 Tlaxcala: Mariano González Zarur 
 Veracruz: Javier Duarte de Ochoa 
 Yucatán
Ivonne Ortega Pacheco , until September 30
Rolando Zapata Bello , starting October 1
 Zacatecas: Miguel Alonso Reyes 
Head of Government of the Federal District
Marcelo Ebrard , until December 4
Miguel Ángel Mancera , starting December 5

Events

 January 4 – Altamira prison brawl: Thirty-one killed and 13 injured in a Tamaulipas prison.
February 7 – The Estela de Luz to commemorate the bicentennial of the Independence of Mexico is inaugurated in Mexico City.
 February 19 – Apodaca prison riot: Forty-four killed in a Nuevo León prison.
 March 20 - A magnitude 7.4 earthquake kills two and leaves 30,000 homeless in Oaxaca and Guerrero.
March – Pope Benedict XVI visits Guanajuato.
 April 15 - Reports of superheated rock fragments being hurled into the air by the Popocateptl volcano. Ash and water vapor plumes were reported 15 times over 24 hours.
 April 20 – Álamo bus accident: Forty-three killed and 17 injured in an accident in Veracruz.
 April and May – 2012 Nuevo Laredo massacres, April 17, April 24 and May 4.
 May 3 – 2012 Veracruz murder of journalists: The bodies of two journalists were recovered in Veracruz on World Press Freedom Day.
 May 13 – Cadereyta Jiménez massacre: At least 49 people are killed in the Mexican Drug War.
 June 9 – Miss Latin America 2012 won by Georgina Méndez Pimentel, 24, in the Riveria Maya. 
 June 18 and 19 – 2012 G-20 Los Cabos summit 
 August 12 – Edgar Morales Perez, PRI mayor-elect of Matehuala, San Luis Potosí, and his campaign manager were assassinated by unknown attackers.
 August 19: 2012 Michoacán murder of photographers 
 December 9: 2012 Mexico Learjet 25 crash

Elections

 2012 Mexican general election
 2012 Federal District of Mexico head of government election
 2012 Chiapas gubernatorial election
 2012 Guanajuato gubernatorial election
 2012 Jalisco gubernatorial election
 2012 Morelos gubernatorial election
 2012 Tabasco gubernatorial election
 2012 Yucatán gubernatorial election

Awards

Belisario Domínguez Medal of Honor – Ernesto de la Peña (post mortem)
Order of the Aztec Eagle – Bono
National Prize for Arts and Sciences
Linguistics and literature – Francisco Manuel Hernández Pérez
Physics, Mathematics, and Natural Sciences – Rubén Gerardo Barrera Pérez, Carlos Artemio Coello Coello, Susana Lizano
Technology and Design – Sergio Antonio Estrada Parra
Popular Arts and Traditions - Antonio Camilo Bautista Jariz, Grupo “Cofradía de San Juan Bautista”, “Comunidad de Músicos Tradicionales formada por las Familias Vega-Utrera”
Fine arts – Arón Claudio Bitrán Goren, Helene Joy Laville Perren, Fernando González Gortázar
History, Social Sciences, and Philosophy – Carlos Marichal Salinas, Carlos Muñoz Izquierdo
National Public Administration Prize
Ohtli Award
 Alexander Gonzalez
 Charlie Gonzalez
 Carlos Gutierrez
 Salud Carbajal
 Francisco G. Cigarroa 
 Paddy Moloney
 Mel Martínez
 David J. Schmidly
 Richard A. Tapia
 Alfredo Quiñones-Hinojosa
 Edward James Olmos

Film

 List of Mexican films of 2012

Music

 List of number-one albums of 2012 (Mexico)

Sport

Soccer/Football

 2011–12 Mexican Primera División season 
 Apertura 2012 Copa MX 
 2012 Copa de México de Naciones 
 2012 CONCACAF Champions League Finals 
 2012 Homeless World Cup 
 Mexico wins the 2012 Olympic Football tournament

Racing

 2012 LATAM Challenge Series season 
 2012 Rally México 
 2012 Super Copa Telcel

Wrestling

 Homenaje a Dos Leyendas (2012)
 Héroes Inmortales (2012) 
 Rebelión de los Juniors (2012) 
 Rey del Ring (2012) 
 IWRG Ruleta de la Muerte (2012) 
 Arena Naucalpan 35th Anniversary Show 
 Caravan de Campeones (2012) 
 El Castillo del Terror (2012) 
 Prison Fatal (2012) 
 Legado Final (2012) 
 Gran Cruzada (2012) 
 Festival de las Máscaras (2012) 
 CMLL Torneo Nacional de Parejas Increibles (2012) 
 Guerra de Empresas (2012)
 Guerra del Golfo (2012)

Misc

 2012 Vuelta a Mexico 
 Men's Abierto Mexicano de Raquetas 2012 
 2012 NACAC Under-23 Championships in Athletics 
 2012 Women's Pan-American Volleyball Cup 
 2012 Boys' Youth NORCECA Volleyball Championship 
 2012 Girls' Youth NORCECA Volleyball Championship 
 Mexico at the 2012 Summer Olympics
 Mexico at the 2012 Summer Paralympics 
 Mexico at the 2012 Winter Youth Olympics

Notable births

Notable deaths

January 7 – Raúl Régulo Quirino Garza, journalist (La Última Palabra) in Cadereyta, Nuevo León; killed.
 May 13 — René Orta Salgado, journalist and politician ; assassinated (b. ca. 1969)
 May 15 – Carlos Fuentes, Mexico-born author (La muerte de Artemio Cruz, Aura, Terra Nostra, Gringo Viejo), (born 1928)
 April 1 – Miguel de la Madrid, 52nd President of Mexico, 1982-1988 (born 1934)
 April 20
Mario Arturo Acosta Chaparro, military leader (born 1942)
Héctor Javier Salinas Aguirre, journalist (920 Radio Noticias), in	Chihuahua, Chihuahua; killed.
Javier Moya Muñoz, journalist (920 Radio Noticias), in Chihuahua, Chihuahua; killed.
April 28 – Regina Martínez Pérez, journalist (Proceso) in Xalapa, Veracruz; killed.
May 3 – 2012 Veracruz murder of journalists:
Gabriel Huge Córdova, journalist (Notiver) in Boca del Río, Veracruz; killed.
Guillermo Luna Varela, journalist (Veracruznews).
Esteban Rodríguez, journalist (Diario AZ).
Ana Irasema Becerra Jiménez, journalist (El Dictamen).
May 12 - Carlos Fuentes, writer (La muerte de Artemio Cruz, Aura, Terra Nostra, Gringo Viejo)
May 13 – René Orta Salgado, journalist (El Sol de Cuernavaca) in Cuernavaca, Morelos; killed.
May 18 – Marco Antonio Ávila García, journalist (Sonora Diario Sonora de la Tarde & El Regional de Ciudad Obregón) in Empalme, Sonora; killed.
June 14 – Víctor Manuel Báez Chinojournalist (Milenio Xalapa) in Xalapa, Veracruz; killed.
June 30 – Armando Montaño, journalist (The Associated Press) in Mexico City; killed.
August 5 – Chavela Vargas – Costa Rican singer who lived in Cuernavaca.
 August 12 – Edgar Morales Perez, mayor-elect of Matehuala, San Luis Potosi
August 19 – Ernesto Araujo Cano, journalist (El Heraldo de Chihuahua) in Chihuahua, Chihuahua; killed.
August 20 – 2012 Michoacán murder of photographers in Ecuandureo, Michoacán:
José Antonio Aguilar Mota, freelance photographer; killed.
Arturo Barajas López, photographer (Diario de Zamora); killed.
September 25 – Alonso Lujambio, 50, Senator and former Secretary of Public Education; cancer
 October 7 – Heriberto Lazcano Lazcano, gang leader (Los Zetas); killed by the navy
October 15 – Ramón Abel López Aguilar, journalist (Tijuana Informativo) in Tijuana, Baja California; killed.
November 14 – Adrián Silva Moreno, freelance journalist in Tehuacán, Puebla; killed.
 November 15 – María Santos Gorrostieta Salazar, 36, politician , former mayor of Tiquicheo, Michoacan; beaten to death (body found on this date).
December 4 – Miguel Ángel Calero Rodríguez, soccer player (C.F. Pachuca)
 December 9 – Jenni Rivera, banda singer and coach of La Voz... México
December 22 – David Araujo Arévalo, journalist (Novedades de Acapulco) in Acapulco, Guerrero; murdered.

References

External links